Sport management is the field of business dealing with sports and recreation. Sports management involves any combination of skills that correspond with planning, organizing, directing, controlling, budgeting, leading, or evaluating of any organization or business within the sports field. The field of sport management has its origins in the Physical Education Department. The discipline has evolved over time to be rooted in the History and Sociology departments. Development of sport management has also extended to esport management growing over the past decade to a $4.5 billion dollar industry as of 2018. The opportunities in sport management have expanded to include sports marketing, sports media analytics, sports sponsorships and sports facilities management

Education
Bachelor's and master's degrees in sport management are offered by many colleges and universities. It is important to focus on Sports science when one does research on the impact of sport degrees. In the United States, the top five universities that offer a degree in Sports Management are Rice University, University of Michigan, University of Florida, University of Miami and Southern Methodist University.

Jobs 
American sport management roles pay an average of $41,645 annually. In America, jobs in sport management include working for professional programs like the NFL, NBA, MLB, NHL, MLS, and other professional or non-professional sport leagues in terms of marketing, health, and promotions. Sports management jobs consist of a variety of options which include the following:

 Athletic Coach
 Athlete Development Specialist
 Athletic Director
 Business Development Coordinator
 Contract Administrator
 Contract Negotiation Manager
 Event Coordinator
 Facilities Manager
 Financial Analyst
 Fitness Manager
 Fraud Manager
 Marketing Consultant
 Marketing Coordinator
 Operations Manager
 Public Relations Manager
 Sales Coordinator
 Sport Agent
 Sport Lawyer

See also
Hungarian system

References

Further reading
 
 Drayer, Joris, Stephen L. Shapiro, and Seoki Lee. "Dynamic ticket pricing in sport: an agenda for research and practice." Sport Marketing Quarterly 21.3 (2012): 184+
 Barr, Lisa, Hums, Carol, Masteralexis, Mary "Principles and Practice of Sport Management 6th Edition"

 
+Management
.